Wang Houbin is a vice admiral (zhongjiang) of the People's Liberation Army Navy (PLAN) of China. He has been Deputy Commander of the People's Liberation Army Navy since December 2019, and formerly served as its Deputy Chief of Staff. He attained the rank of rear admiral (shaojiang) in December 2014, and was promoted to the rank of vice admiral (zhongjiang) in December 2019.

Biography
Wang enlisted in the People's Liberation Army (PLA) in 1979. He was Deputy Chief of Staff of East Sea Fleet and Deputy Commander of Zhoushan Coastal Defence Region before serving as Chief of Staff of South Sea Fleet in January 2016. In April 2018 he was promoted to become Deputy Chief of Staff  of the People's Liberation Army Navy (PLAN), a position he held until December 2019, when he was appointed Deputy Commander there.

References

Living people
People's Liberation Army Navy admirals
Year of birth missing (living people)